Chong Chieng Jen (Pha̍k-fa-sṳ: Chông Khien-ìn, born 12 February 1971), is a Malaysian politician and lawyer who served as the Deputy Minister of Domestic Trade and Consumer Affairs in the Pakatan Harapan (PH) administration under former Prime Minister Mahathir Mohamad and former Minister Saifuddin Nasution Ismail from July 2018 to the collapse of the PH administration in February 2020. He has served as the Member of Parliament (MP) for Stampin since May 2018, Bandar Kuching from March 2004 to May 2018 and Member of the Sarawak State Legislative Assembly (MLA) for Padungan since December 2021 and Kota Sentosa from May 2006 to December 2021. He served as Leader of the Opposition of Sarawak from June 2013 to November 2020. He is a member, National Vice-Chairman, State Chairman of Sarawak, Branch Chairman of Kuching and Youth Advisor of Sarawak as well as Kuching of the Democratic Action Party (DAP), a component party of the PH opposition coalition.

Personal life and education 
Chong started his primary education in SJK(C) Methodist (Methodist Chinese National Primary School), Sibu. He continued his Primary 3 to 5 education at Kuching's SJK(C) Chung Hua No. 3 (Chung Hua No. 3 Chinese National Primary School), and Primary 6 at SRK St. Theresa Padungan (St. Theresa Padungan National Primary School), Kuching. Chong later undertook his secondary education in SMK St. Joseph, Kuching (St. Joseph, Kuching National Secondary School) and Saint Patrick's School, Singapore. He was admitted into Victoria Junior College, one of the top junior colleges in Singapore.

Chong pursued his tertiary studies at the Australian National University, Canberra and graduated with a Bachelor of Commerce, majoring in accounting & economics, and Bachelor of Laws.

Legal career 
He works as an advocate in Kuching and is attached to the legal firm Messrs Chong Brothers Advocates.

Political career 
Chong first took part in the 10th Malaysian general election, contesting for the Bandar Kuching parliamentary seat as a DAP candidate but lost to Sarawak United People's Party (SUPP) candidate, Song Swee Guan. In the following 10th Sarawak state election, he contested for the Padungan state seat, eventually losing out to Lily Yong Lee Lee, also a SUPP candidate.

In the 11th Malaysian general election, Chong was elected as MP for Bandar Kuching with a 2,041 majority vote, and later, Sarawak state assemblyman for the newly created seat of Kota Sentosa in following the results of the 11th Sarawak state election.

Chong defended his parliamentary seat in the 12th Malaysian general election with an increased majority. In 2011, he once again, he defended his state seat, this time against Yap Chin Loi, with a majority vote of 4,824.

On 17 December 2012, during the DAP 16th National Congress, Chong was among seven DAP leaders appointed to the party's Central Executive Committee (CEC). On 5 May 2013, he contested for the Bandar Kuching parliamentary seat for the final time in the 13th Malaysian general election and retained the seat with an even larger majority of 19,642 against SUPP's Tan Kai.

On 7 May 2016, during the 11th Sarawak state election, Chong retained his Kota Sentosa state seat with a majority vote of 2,819 against Yap Yau Sin. On 12 November 2017, during the DAP Central Executive Committee (CEC) re-election, Chong was re-elected as one of the party's five national vice-chairperson.

Following incumbent Stampin MP Julian Tan Kok Ping's decision to retire from politics, Chong moved to contest the Stampin parliamentary seat against SUPP president Sim Kui Hian in the 14th Malaysian general election (GE14) on 9 May 2018, which was seen as a 'grey' or unsafe seat following redelineation by the Election Commission (EC). His special assistant, Kelvin Yii Lee Wuen, contested for the Bandar Kuching seat. Chong went on to win with a majority vote of 14,221. Following the historic events of the GE14 which saw the first-ever change in the Government of Malaysia and end of six decades of National Front (BN) rule, on 2 July 2018, Chong was sworn-in as Deputy Minister of Domestic Trade and Consumer Affairs of Malaysia by the Yang di-Pertuan Agong (King of Malaysia).

In the 12th Sarawak state election, Chong's special assistant, Michael Kong Feng Nian was selected to contest in Kota Sentosa whereas Chong went on to contest in the Padungan state seat against the mayor of Kuching South, Datuk Wee Hong Seng. Chong went on to win the Padungan state seat with a majority of 1,198.

Election results

See also 
 Bandar Kuching (federal constituency)
 Stampin (federal constituency)
 Kota Sentosa (state constituency)

References 

Malaysian people of Hakka descent
20th-century Malaysian lawyers
21st-century Malaysian politicians
Sarawak politicians
Victoria Junior College alumni
Living people
Democratic Action Party (Malaysia) politicians
1971 births
Members of the Dewan Rakyat
Australian National University alumni
People from Kuching
Malaysian politicians of Chinese descent
Members of the Sarawak State Legislative Assembly
Leaders of the Opposition in the Sarawak State Legislative Assembly
21st-century Malaysian lawyers